Miroslav Dvořák may refer to:

Miroslav Dvořák (ice hockey) (1951–2008), Czech ice hockey player
Miroslav Dvořák (skier) (born 1987), Czech Nordic combined skier